Mecyclothorax sedlaceki is a species of ground beetle in the subfamily Psydrinae. It was described by Darlington in 1971.

References

sedlaceki
Beetles described in 1971